Bruno Ferreira Bonfim (born 19 January 1989) is a Brazilian professional footballer who most recently played for Ceará as a forward. His nickname Dentinho means “little tooth” in Portuguese.

He began his career at Corinthians in 2007, and won three titles with the club, the 2009 Copa do Brasil, 2009 Campeonato Paulista, and the 2008 Campeonato Brasileiro Série B. He stayed at the club for four years until moving to Ukraine in 2011 to play for Shakhtar Donetsk, with which he won a domestic treble in 2012: the Ukrainian Premier League, Ukrainian Cup, and Ukrainian Super Cup. He was briefly loaned out to Turkish club Beşiktaş in 2013.

Dentinho has been capped at the youth international levels with the Brazil under-20 team, making six appearances and scoring 1 goal. He was part of the squad that won the 2009 South American U-20 Championship.

Career

Corinthians

2007
After being presented from the youth team as a promising youngster, he made his first appearance for Corinthians in the Campeonato Brasileiro Série A during the derby game against Palmeiras, and scored his first goal in a draw against Fluminense on 7 July 2007.

2008
He was Corinthians's top scorer during the Campeonato Paulista 2008.
He also was the team's top scorer alongside German Herrera with 14 goals during the Campeonato Brasileiro Série B 2008, which the club won.

2009
Dentinho led Corinthians to the league and cup title alongside new Corinthians signing Ronaldo during the 2009 Campeonato Paulista and the 2009 Copa do Brasil. He scored in the cup semifinal on 27 May 2009 in a 1–1 draw against Vasco da Gama to help Corinthians pass to the final and beat Internacional. On 30 September 2009, Dentinho signed an agreement with Corinthians in order to extend his contract until December 2013. He also received a salary increase, with a release clause of over 30 million euros.

2010
Dentinho scored his first ever goal in Copa Libertadores for Corinthians on 10 March 2010, a strike from just outside the area to draw level in a group fixture away to Colombian club Independiente Medellín.

Shakhtar Donetsk
On 18 May 2011, Dentinho signed a five-year contract with Ukrainian club Shakhtar Donetsk. The deal between Corinthians and Shakhtar was reported to be €7.5 million. It saw Dentinho join a team with several Brazilian players already amongst their ranks, including former Corinthians teammate Willian and fellow Brazilian U20 player Douglas Costa.

On 10 July, he came on as a 58th minute substitution for Alex Teixeira, scoring just five minutes into his debut, in a 4–0 win against Obolon Kyiv. He managed three goals in 18 league appearances in his first season with Shakhtar. The club clinched the title for the 2011–12 Premier League season as well as the Ukrainian Cup. Dentinho was an unused substitute for the 2–0 2012 Super Cup victory over Metalurh Donetsk. He scored a goal in his first start of the 2012–13 season in a 3–0 victory over Karpaty Lviv.

In May 2019, Dentinho scored his first hat-trick for Shakhtar in a 4–0 league victory against FC Mariupol.

On 1 December 2020, Dentinho scored in a 2–0 UEFA Champions League group stage victory against Real Madrid.

On 8 November 2021 his contract with Shakhtar was expired.

Beşiktaş JK (loan)
On 23 January 2013, Dentinho was loaned out to Süper Lig club Besiktas until January 2014. On the last day of 2013 his loan deal expired and therefore he returned to Shakhtar.

Ceará
On 2 March 2022, Ceará announced the signing of Dentinho on a contract until the end of 2022.

Personal life
Dentinho married model Danielle Souza in 2012. They have three children: son Bruno Lucas (born 2012) and identical twins Sophia and Rafaella (born 2014).

Career statistics

Honours
Corinthians
 Copa do Brasil: 2009
 Campeonato Paulista: 2009
 Campeonato Brasileiro Série B: 2008

Shakhtar Donetsk
 Ukrainian Premier League: 2011–12, 2013–14, 2016–17, 2017–18, 2018–19
 Ukrainian Cup: 2011–12, 2015–16, 2016–17, 2017–18, 2018–19
 Ukrainian Super Cup:  2012, 2014, 2015, 2017
Brazil U20
South American Youth Championship: 2009

References

External links
 Globoesporte 
 

1989 births
Living people
Footballers from São Paulo
Brazilian footballers
Brazil youth international footballers
Brazilian expatriate footballers
Expatriate footballers in Ukraine
Expatriate footballers in Turkey
Brazilian expatriate sportspeople in Turkey
Sport Club Corinthians Paulista players
FC Shakhtar Donetsk players
Beşiktaş J.K. footballers
Ceará Sporting Club players
Campeonato Brasileiro Série A players
Ukrainian Premier League players
Süper Lig players
Association football forwards
Brazilian expatriate sportspeople in Ukraine